Igwali Island (also known as Paples Island) is an island north of Sariba Island, and on the eastern side of China Strait, in Milne Bay Province, Papua New Guinea.

Administration 
The island is part of Sidudu Ward, which belongs to Bwanabwana Rural Local Level Government Area LLG, Samarai-Murua District, which are in Milne Bay Province.

Geography 
The island is part of the Sariba group, itself a part of Samarai Islands of the Louisiade Archipelago.

Demographics 
The population of 10 is living in 3 separate hamlets. Igwali in the central west coast, Naba Riaria on the northwest point, and Ga-Uri on the southeast point.

Economy 
The islanders, are farmers as opposed to eastern Louisiade Archipelago islanders. they grow Sago, Taro, and Yams for crops.

Transportation 
There is a slipway at Igwali.

References

Islands of Milne Bay Province
Louisiade Archipelago